Daviesia ovata, commonly known as broad-leaf daviesia, is a species of flowering plant in the family Fabaceae and is endemic to a restricted part of the south-west of Western Australia. It is a dense, bushy, glabrous shrub with egg-shaped to elliptic phyllodes and orange and maroon flowers.

Description

Taxonomy
Daviesia ovata was first described in 1864 by George Bentham in Flora Australiensis from specimens collected by James Drummond. The specific epithet (ovata) means "wider below the middle".

Distribution and habitat
Broad-leaf daviesia grows among granite rocks in low mallee-heath or shrubland near Mount Manypeaks, east of Albany in the Esperance Plains biogeographic region of south-western Western Australia.

Conservation status
This daviesia is listed as "Threatened" by the Western Australian Government Department of Parks and Wildlife, meaning that it is in danger of extinction.

References

ovata
Flora of Western Australia
Taxa named by George Bentham
Plants described in 1864